Calothamnus quadrifidus subsp. quadrifidus is a plant in the myrtle family, Myrtaceae and is endemic to the south-west of Western Australia.  It is similar to other subspecies of Calothamnus quadrifidus except that its leaves are circular in cross section and the leaves and flower cup (the hypanthium) usually have a sparse covering of long, soft hairs. (The only other subspecies with cylinder-shaped leaves is teretifolius and its leaves and hypanthium are glabrous.)

Description
Its leaves are linear, sometimes slightly expanded in the middle, and circular in cross section.

The flowers are red and arranged in clusters, usually on one side of the stem amongst the older leaves.

Taxonomy and naming
Calothamnus quadrifidus subsp. quadrifidus was first formally described in 2010 by Alex George in Nuytsia.

Distribution and habitat
Calothamnus quadrifidus subsp. quadrifidus is the most variable subspecies and occurs over the widest area. It is found in the western part of the wheatbelt and as far north as Northampton, as far inland as Mullewa and Hyden and as far south as Albany and Israelite Bay. It grows in sand and soils derived from granite or laterite.

Conservation
Calothamnus quadrifidus subsp. quadrifidus is classified as "not threatened" by the Western Australian government department of parks and wildlife

References

quadrifidus
Myrtales of Australia
Plants described in 2010
Plant subspecies